The APEV Pouchelec is a French amateur-built electric aircraft, that was designed by Daniel Dalby and produced by APEV of Peynier. When it was available the aircraft was supplied as plans or as a kit for amateur construction.

Design and development
The Pouchelec is a development of the APEV Pouchel Light, adapted for electric power, including revised landing gear and longer span wings with greater surface area. The original Pouchel was constructed using three commercially available aluminium ladders, hence APEV is the Association pour la Promotion des Echelles Volantes, or in English, Association for the Promotion of Flying Ladders. Later models were forced to move to rectangular aluminium tubing when the ladder manufacturer grew concerned about liability. The Pouchel series are all derivatives of the classic 1930s Henri Mignet-designed Mignet Pou-du-Ciel (Flying Flea).

The Pouchelec features a cantilever rear wing with a strut-braced parasol front wing, a single-seat open cockpit without a windshield, fixed conventional landing gear and a single engine in tractor configuration. The aircraft is made from bolted-together aluminum tubing, with its flying surfaces covered in Dacron sailcloth. The engine supplied is a  AGNI 119R electric motor powered by a Kokam Lithium-ion polymer battery pack, which gives a 30-minute flight endurance.

As of late 2017 it was no longer listed as available as plans or a kit.

Operational history
Bayerl et al. describe the aircraft in flight as "wonderfully quiet".

Specifications (Pouchelec)

References

External links
Official website 
Video of early test flights

Homebuilt aircraft
Single-engined tractor aircraft
Electric aircraft
Pouchelec
Tandem-wing aircraft